First Came the Law is the first full-length album released by Once Nothing. It is the band's third release overall, and its first on Solid State Records.

Track listing
The Intimidator - 4:11
Avoid Me Like The Plague - 4:07
Juliet or at Least What's Left of Her - 4:24
Gunfire is the Sound of Freedom - 4:44
The Dust of a Town - 3:36
My Sweet Medusa - 4:07
Columbus Wasn't Looking For America - 4:18
Then There Were Nine - 4:53
All My Heroes Are Cowboys - 4:51
The Truth About Me or Someone Like Me - 5:04
Whiskey Breath - 5:10
...And Then Came Grace - 8:37
 "How To Build A Sand Castle" (hidden track)

Personnel
Todd Lowry - Vocals
Josh Branas - Rhythm Guitar
Dave Burkes - Lead Guitar
Steve Lucarelli - Bass
Giuseppe "Joey" Capolupo - drums
Recorded, Mixed, and Mastered by Jamie King
Mastered by Troy Glessner at Spectre
Art Direction & Design by Jordan Butcher
Additional vocals Once Nothing, Geoff Jenkins

Lyrical content
-The lyrics on "First Came The Law" are written by Todd. He writes about his personal experiences.

-"Juliet or at Least What's Left Of Her" is about Todd's touring in Alabama. He said he hadn't eaten and was dehydrated and Alabama was extremely hot. He passed out at a BP station.

References

2008 albums
Once Nothing albums
Solid State Records albums